is  the General manager of the Koshigaya Alphas in the Japanese B.League.

Head coaching record

|- 
| style="text-align:left;"|Kyoto Hannaryz
| style="text-align:left;"|2010
| 10||2||8|||| style="text-align:center;"|6th in Western|||-||-||-||
| style="text-align:center;"|-
|-
|- 
| style="text-align:left;"|Kyoto Hannaryz
| style="text-align:left;"|2010-11
| 48||28||20|||| style="text-align:center;"|5th in Western|||3||1||2||
| style="text-align:center;"|Lost in 1st round
|- 
| style="text-align:left;"|Link Tochigi Brex
| style="text-align:left;"|2012
| 4||1||3|||| style="text-align:center;"|6th|||-||-||-||
| style="text-align:center;"|-
|-
| style="text-align:left;"|Otsuka Corporation Alphas
| style="text-align:left;"|2013-14
| 32||11||21|||| style="text-align:center;"|7th|||-||-||-||
| style="text-align:center;"|-
|-
| style="text-align:left;"|Otsuka Corporation Alphas
| style="text-align:left;"|2014-15
| 32||16||16|||| style="text-align:center;"|5th|||-||-||-||
| style="text-align:center;"|-
|-
| style="text-align:left;"|Otsuka Corporation Alphas
| style="text-align:left;"|2015-16
| 36||26||10|||| style="text-align:center;"|2nd|||-||-||-||
| style="text-align:center;"|-
|-
| style="text-align:left;"|Otsuka Corporation Alphas
| style="text-align:left;"|2016-17
| 42||24||18|||| style="text-align:center;"|4th in B3|||10||1||9||
| style="text-align:center;"|6th in Final stage
|-
| style="text-align:left;"|Otsuka Corporation Alphas
| style="text-align:left;"|2017-18
| 42||27||15|||| style="text-align:center;"|2nd in B3|||20||13||7||
| style="text-align:center;"|2nd in Final stage
|-

References

1976 births
Living people
Kyoto Sangyo University alumni
Kyoto Hannaryz coaches
Japanese basketball coaches
Utsunomiya Brex coaches
Otsuka Corporation Alphas coaches
Saitama Broncos coaches